Stocki may refer to:

 Stocki (surname)
 Stocki Młyn, a village in northern Poland
 Las Stocki, a village in eastern Poland
 Ernst Stockinger, a character in German television series Inspector Rex

See also
 
 Stocky (disambiguation)